The first season of American crime-comedy-drama television series Castle premiered as a midseason replacement on ABC on March 9, 2009. The season aired from March 9, 2009, to May 11, 2009. The first season consisted of 10 episodes.

Overview
Richard Castle (Fillion) is a famous mystery novelist who has killed off the main character (Derek Storm) in his popular book series and has writer's block. He is brought in by the NYPD for questioning regarding two copy-cat murders based on two of his novels. He is intrigued by this new window into crime and murder, and uses his connection with the mayor to charm his way into shadowing Detective Kate Beckett (Katic). Castle decides to use Beckett as his muse for Nikki Heat, the main character of his next book series. Beckett, an avid reader of Castle's books, initially disapproves of having Castle shadow her work, but later warms up and recognizes Castle as a useful resource in her team's investigations.

Cast

Main cast
 Nathan Fillion as Richard Castle
 Stana Katic as Dt. Kate Beckett
 Jon Huertas as Dt. Javier Esposito
 Seamus Dever as Dt. Kevin Ryan
 Tamala Jones as Dr. Lanie Parish
 Ruben Santiago-Hudson as Captain Roy Montgomery
 Molly C. Quinn as Alexis Castle
 Susan Sullivan as Martha Rodgers

Recurring cast
 Dan Castellaneta as Judge Markway 
 Joseph C. Phillips as the Mayor 
 Bailey Chase as Will Sorenson 
 Stephen J. Cannell as himself 
 Michael Connelly as himself
 Scott Paulin as Jim Beckett

Episodes

Reception
The first season received positive to mixed reviews from critics. The first season got a rating of 56% on Rotten Tomatoes based on 16 reviews. The season got a 54/100 rating on Metacritic. Keith Phipps from The A.V. Club gave the premiere a B, giving the series praise for managing to go outside the "cliché" characters, giving both Nathan Fillion and Stana Katic praise for their portrayal and saying that Katic "suggests unspoken vulnerability and need." Jonah Krakow from IGN also commented on the cliche storytelling as he said "Castle proves that even a show with an unoriginal idea can be interesting and enjoyable if done well." He also praised Fillion for his portrayal of Richard Castle: "Fillion's ability to convey humor, awe and sarcasm in even the most gruesome situations makes him the perfect choice for the role. Not every actor can do what he does and the writers do a good job of playing to his strengths."

DVD release

Awards and nominations

References

2009 American television seasons
Season 1